Meitingen is a market town in the district of Augsburg, in Bavaria, Germany.

History 

Meitingen was firstly mentioned in a certificate in 1231. Since the German Mediatisation Meitingen belongs to Bavaria in 1803. In 1844 the railroad line Augsburg-Nürnberg arrived Meitingen. The construction of the Lech-channel determined series of flooding caused by the river Lech. 
In 1928 the Catholic priest Dr. Max-Josef Metzger founded the Christkönigshaus. Because of his dedication in the international peace movement he was a thorn in the Nazis' flesh. He was murdered after a denunciation in Brandenburg-Görden in 1944. His corpse rests at the local graveyard. His gravestone, a memorial tablet at the Christkönigshaus, the name of a street and of the secondary school remember his dedication.

With the construction of the hydro-electric power plant of the Lech-channel the industrialization of Meitingen started. Until 1972 Meitingen was a part of the district of Wertingen but because of local government reforms Erlingen, Herbertshofen, Ostendorf, Langenreichen and Waltershofen became a part of Meitingen. In succession of the growth and the importance for the environs Meitingen became a market town in 1989.

Districts 

 Meitingen, main location
 Herbertshofen, village
 Erlingen, village
 Ostendorf, village
 Waltershofen, village
 Langenreichen, village

Neighbor communities 
 Biberbach (District of Augsburg)
 Ellgau (District of Augsburg)
 Kühlenthal (District of Augsburg)
 Westendorf (District of Augsburg)
 Langweid am Lech (District of Augsburg)
 Thierhaupten (District of Augsburg)
 Wertingen (District of Dillingen)

Politics 

There are 24 seats in the town council:

 Christian-Social Union of Bavaria (CSU): 9 seats
 Social Democratic Party of Germany (SPD): 3 seats
 Freie Lechtaler Wählergemeinschaft (FLW): 4 seats
 Freie Wähler Gruppe Meitingen (FWG): 2 seats
 Unpolitische Wahl-Gemeinschaft (UWG): 3 seats
 Junge Bürger Union (JBU): 2 seats
 Freie Wählergemeinschaft (FWGem): 1 seat

Coat of arms

The emblem shows a silver bear with a golden necklace and a silver river on a red background.  The emblem was extracted from the heraldic figure of the old nobility of Meitingen. Instead of a black bear on a golden background, the colours white and black were chosen to show the former belonging to Burgau. In the emblem of Burgau the colours red and white are dominating.

Sister city 
Meitingen's sister city is Pouzauges, Vendée, France. Through an exchange program, every year pupils from France visit the secondary school of Meitingen.

Economy and infrastructure 

The SGL Carbon Company has an office in Meitingen. This company produces ceramic brake disks and graphite electrodes. The SGL Carbon Company is listed in the MDAX.

Traffic 

Through Meitingen goes the federal highway 2, B2,  between Augsburg and Donauwörth. There is a railroad connection between Augsburg and Donauwörth which passes through Meitingen.

Education 

In Meitingen there are the following schools:
 Elementary school
 Primary school
 Secondary school (Dr.Max-Josef-Metzger Schule)

Sports 

Meitingen has a sports club, the TSV Meitingen. This club includes different types of sport.

References

Augsburg (district)